Afghanistan is a member of the South Asian Zone of the Olympic Council of Asia (OCA), and has participated in the Asian Games since their inception in 1951. The Afghanistan National Olympic Committee, established in 1935 and recognised by the International Olympic Committee in 1936, is the National Olympic Committee for Afghanistan.

Afghanistan was one of the first five founding members of the Asian Games Federation on 13 February 1949, in New Delhi; the organisation was disbanded on 26 November 1981 and replaced by the Olympic Council of Asia.

Membership of Olympic Council of Asia
Afghanistan is a member of the South Asian Zone of the Olympic Council of Asia, the governing body of all the sports in Asia, recognised by the International Olympic Committee as the continental association of Asia. Being a member of South Asian Zone, Afghanistan also participates in the South Asian Games, sub-regional Games for South Asia.

The OCA organises five major continental-level multi-sport events: the Asian Summer Games (which are commonly known as the Asian Games), Asian Winter Games, Asian Indoor-Martial Arts Games, Asian Beach Games, and Asian Youth Games. Before 2009, Indoor and Martial Arts were two separate events for indoor and martial arts sports respectively. However, the OCA has since amalgamated them into a single event, the Asian Indoor-Martial Arts Games, which will be debuted in 2013 in Incheon, South Korea. As a member of OCA, Afghanistan is privileged to participate in all these multi-sport events.

Asian Games

Afghanistan has competed in the Asian Games since the inaugural edition of the Games in 1951 in New Delhi. On 26 September 1996, the Taliban took over Kabul and established the Islamic Emirate of Afghanistan. Under the Taliban regime all types of sporting activities were deprecated, as according to the Taliban, most of them were against the teachings of Islam and Islamic law. Many stadiums, like Ghazi Stadium of Kabul, were either destroyed or converted into venues for public executions and punishments. Women were banned from taking part in any type of sport; male athletes were allowed to participate in a few sports, but were forced to wear long sleeves, trousers and beards. Following such incidents and discrimination against women, the International Olympic Committee (IOC) banned the Afghanistan National Olympic Committee and barred them from taking part in the Olympic Games.

A few months before the 2000 Summer Olympics, the IOC offered the Afghanistan National Olympic Committee the opportunity to send a contingent to the Games without the Taliban flag. The Committee declined to take part on this condition.

Afghanistan did not send a delegation to the 1998 Asian Games held in Bangkok, Thailand, due to economic difficulties. Laws implemented by the Taliban government also made it impossible for Afghan athletes to compete. For example, the International Boxing Association (AIBA) does not allow players to have beards and mustaches, but Afghan males were forbidden to cut their facial hair. Afghanistan returned to the Asian Games after the fall of the Taliban government in the midst of an ongoing war. In June 2003, the IOC lifted the suspension imposed on Afghanistan during the 115th IOC Session in Prague.

Afghanistan status unclear for the future participation since brought under the political turmoil.

Medals by games

Asian Winter Games

Medals by games

Asian Beach Games

Afghanistan has competed in both the editions of the Asian Beach Games. In the 2008 Asian Beach Games, Afghanistan won two medals, a gold and a bronze. In the 2010 Asian Beach Games in Muscat, no Afghan athletes won any medals.

Medals by games

Asian Indoor and Martial Arts Games

Medals by games

Asian Youth Games

The First Asian Youth Games were held in Singapore from 29 June 2009 to 7 July 2009 and featured over 90 sporting events. Afghanistan did not send its delegation to the Games.

Medals by games

Medals by sport

Asian Games

See also

 :Category:Asian Games competitors for Afghanistan
 Afghanistan at the Olympics
 Afghanistan at the Paralympics

Notes and references
Notes

 The National Olympic Committees are all members of the Association of National Olympic Committees (ANOC), which is also split among five continental associations: Association of National Olympic Committees of Africa, Pan American Sports Organization, Olympic Council of Asia, European Olympic Committees, and Oceania National Olympic Committees.

References

External links
Afghanistan Olympic Committee